The following outline is provided as an overview of and topical guide to botany:

Botany – biological discipline which involves the study of plants.

Core concepts of botany

 Bud
 Cell wall
 Chlorophyll
 Chloroplast
 Flora
 Flower
 Fruit
 Forest
 Leaf
 Meristem
 Photosynthesis
 Plant
 Plant cell
 Pollen
 Seed
 Seedling
 Spore
 Tree
 Vine
 Wood

Subdisciplines of botany

Branches of botany
 Agronomy
 Bryology (mosses and liverworts)
 Dendrology (woody plants)
 Ethnobotany
 Lichenology (lichens)
 Mycology  (fungi)
 Paleobotany
 Palynology (spores and pollen)
 Phycology (algae)
 Phytosociology
 Plant anatomy
 Plant ecology
 Plant evolution
 Plant morphology
 Plant pathology
 Plant physiology
 Plant taxonomy
 Pteridology (ferns)

History of botany

 History of botany
 History of plant systematics

Kinds of plants

Major plant groups

 Algae
 Cyanobacteria
 Brown algae
 Charophyta
 Chlorophyta
 Desmid
 Diatom
 Red algae
 Green algae
 Bryophytes
 Anthocerotophyta (hornworts)
 Bryophyta (mosses)
 Marchantiophyta (liverworts)
 Pteridophytes
 Lycopodiophyta (club mosses)
 Pteridophyta (ferns & horsetails)
 Rhyniophyta (early plants)
 Gymnosperms
 Pteridospermatophyta (seed "ferns")
 Cycadophyta
 Ginkgophyta
 Gnetophyta
 Pinophyta (conifers)
 Angiosperms
 Dicotyledon
 Asteraceae (sunflower family)
 Cactaceae (cactus family)
 Fabaceae (legume family)
 Lamiaceae (mint family)
 Rosaceae (rose family)
 Monocotyledon
 Araceae (arum family)
 Arecaceae (palm family)
 Iridaceae (iris family)
 Orchidaceae (orchid family)
 Poaceae (grass family)

Some well-known plants

 List of culinary fruits
 List of edible seeds
 List of culinary herbs and spices
 List of culinary nuts
 List of vegetables
 List of woods

General plant species concepts
Plant taxonomy
 Cultivated plant taxonomy
 List of systems of plant taxonomy
Clades
Monophyletic
Polyphyletic
Speciation
Isolating mechanisms
Concept of species
Species problem

Notable botanists
In alphabetical order by surname:
 Aristotle
 Arthur Cronquist (angiosperm evolution)
 Charles Darwin (formulated modern theory of evolution)
 Carl Linnaeus (father of systematics)
 Gregor Mendel (father of genetics)
 John Ray
 G. Ledyard Stebbins (angiosperm evolution)
 Theophrastus (uses and classification)
 Robert Thorne (angiosperm evolution)
 Gilbert White
 List of Russian botanists

External links
Hunt Institute for Botanical Documentation
Plant growth and the plant cell from Kimball's Biology Pages
Botanical Society of America: What is Botany?
Science & Plants for Schools
Teaching Documents about Botany Teaching documents, lecture notes and tutorials online: an annotated link directory.
American society of plant biologists APSB
Why study Plants? Department of Plant Sciences, University of Cambridge
Botany Photo of the Day

Flora and other plant catalogs or databases
 The Virtual Library of Botany
 High quality pictures of plants and information about them from Catholic University of Leuven
 Curtis's Botanical Magazine, 1790–1856
 The Trees Of Great Britain and Ireland, by Henry John Elwes & Augustine Henry, 1906–1913
 Botanik-Datenbank (ger.)
 Plant Directory (ger.)
 USDA plant database
 The Linnean Society of London
 Native Plant Information Network

Botany
Botany